Mod Con are an Australian trio consisting of Erica Dunn, Sara Retallick and Raquel Solier.

They released their debut studio album Modern Convenience in April 2018. Their second, Modern Condition was released in October 2021.

History
Mod Con is a three-piece based out of Melbourne who originally played together under the moniker Palm Springs. Having known each other for some time and playing with various solo and collaborative projects. Over Easter 2017, the trio recorded their debut album with Gareth Liddiard at his home in the Goulburn Valley. The album was released in April 2018 and described by NME Australia as "One of the most inventive, attention-grabbing local debuts in recent memory." 

On 18 June 2021, the trio released "Ammo", the lead single from their second studio album Modern Condition. Modern Condition was recorded with engineer John Lee at Phaedra Studios Melbourne and released on 22 October 2021.

Discography

Albums

Awards and nominations

AIR Awards
The Australian Independent Record Awards (commonly known informally as AIR Awards) is an annual awards night to recognise, promote and celebrate the success of Australia's Independent Music sector.

! 
|-
| 2022
| Modern Condition
| Best Independent Punk Album or EP
| 
|

Music Victoria Awards
The Music Victoria Awards, are an annual awards night celebrating Victorian music. The commenced in 2005.

! 
|-
|rowspan="3"|  2018
| Erica Dunn 
| Best Female Musician
| 
|rowspan="3"|  
|-
| Mod Con
| Best Band
| 
|-
| Mod Con
| Breakthrough Act
| 
|-
| 2019
| Erica Dunn 
| Best Female Musician
| 
| 
|-
| 2020
| Erica Dunn 
| Best Musician
| 
| 
|-
| 2021
| Erica Dunn 
| Best Musician
| 
|
|-

References

Australian girl groups
Musical groups established in 2017
2017 establishments in Australia